The singles discography of Hong Kong singer Prudence Liew consists of 47 singles, as well as 4 non-single tracks that charted on airplay charts, and 4 appearances as a guest vocalist.  Working as a film producer, Liew was signed as the flagship artist to Current Records in 1986 after releasing her single, "午夜情 (Midnight Love)" for the movie 午夜麗人 Midnight Beauties.  She released her self-titled debut album in December that year which included her signature song and second single, "最後一夜 (The Last Night)" and sold 500,000 copies, certifying 10× platinum by the Hong Kong IFPI.  Liew has released 8 albums with 24 singles under the Current Records/BMG Pacific label before signing with Columbia Records in 1992 and releasing four more albums, which spawned 10 singles before going on hiatus in 1995.

In 2000, Liew briefly returned to the music scene, albeit in Taiwan where she released her first mandopop album 愛自己 Love Yourself which had one chart-topping single, "每次我都很認真 (Everytime, I Take It Very Seriously)".  In 2008, she returned to the Hong Kong music industry, signing with Universal Music Group label Cinepoly Records and continued to release Cantonese and Mandarin albums, each spawning Top 10 singles.

Singles

1980s - 1990s

2000s - present

Other charted songs

Guest appearances

Notes
A  Metro Broadcast Corporation Limited was not established until 1994, therefore no singles had chart positions beforehand in this column and are marked with NIL.
B  The song Afterwards 事後, which deals with sexual pleasure, was banned by RTHK Radio 2 due to its explicit nature.
C  MOOV Hong Kong Top 100 Singles Chart, measuring the downloads and online airplay of songs in Hong Kong, was not established until 2012, therefore no singles had chart positions beforehand in this column and are marked with NIL.

References
General

Specific

Pop music discographies
Liew Prudence